Paul Crosfield (29 August 1929 – 27 May 2000) was a Greek hurdler. He competed in the men's 110 metres hurdles at the 1948 Summer Olympics.

References

External links
 

1929 births
2000 deaths
Athletes (track and field) at the 1948 Summer Olympics
Greek male hurdlers
Olympic athletes of Greece
Place of birth missing